The Twenty-Seventh Legislature of the Territory of Hawaii was a session of the Hawaii Territorial Legislature.  The session convened in Honolulu, Hawaii, and ran from February 18 until May 19, 1953.

Legislative sessions
A regular session ran from February 18 until May 19, 1953. It passed 282 bills into law.

A special session ran from April 20 until August 5, 1954.  It passed two bills into law, including Act 2, to provide additional funding to the Hawaii Statehood Commission, which was founded in 1947 to pursue statehood status for the territory.

Senators

House of Representatives

References

Notes

Hawaii legislative sessions